Park Bristol is a park in Belgrade, the capital of Serbia. It is situated in the neighborhood of Savamala, between the incoming and outgoing platforms of the Belgrade Main Bus Station. It is located in the municipality of Savski Venac.

Location 
The park is bounded by the streets of Karađorđeva on the east, Hadži Nikole Živkovića on the north and Železnička on the west. Across the street on the southern side is the Belgrade Main Bus Station and its outgoing platforms. In the entire eastern section, the streets of Hadži Nikole Živkovića and Železnička are turned into the incoming platforms and the access street to it. To the east, across the Karađorđeva street, is the location of the University of Belgrade Faculty of Economics and another park, Park Luka Ćelović. North of the park is the hotel "Bristol".

Name and history 
Predecessor of the park was a garden planted by Luka Ćelović. He was one of the richest and most influential Serbs in the early 20th century, head of the Belgrade Cooperative, a merchant and a major philanthropist. He managed to obtain a permit from the city authorities to plant a European-style garden on his land. He planted roses, ornamental plants and trees and personally took care of the garden for years. Young park is already visible on the 1910 postcard from Belgrade, which makes it one of the oldest in the city. Park was fully developed in the 1910s and 1920s, but the author of the project is not known. The park was originally called Nikoljski (Saint Nicholas' park after the nearby Svetonikolski trg (Square of the Saint Nicholas), but in time, the name was replaced with Bristol, after the Hotel Bristol which is right next to the park.

Originally, the park stretched from the hotel to the Belgrade Main railway station, including the area occupied today by the Main Bus Station. When Germans built the Old Sava Bridge in 1942, they also constructed the access street to it which split the park in half. Section of the park which remained close to the railway station was demolished to make place for the new bus station. When the station was expanded in 1984, last remnants of that section were destroyed, leaving only one plane tree and the part of the steps towards the Karađorđeva street.

Even though Luka Ćelović built the Bristol park, in 2004 city government named the park across it in his honor, "Park Luka Ćelović", which historically has nothing to do with Ćelović. It was the location of a school which was destroyed during the bombing of Belgrade on 6 April 1941. The park which was built later was unofficially known for decades as the "Park at the Economics Faculty".

Characteristics 

Due to its location, all the visitors who come to Belgrade by bus, must pass by or through the park. In the section close to the hotel, there is a plane tree which is thought to be planted when the park was originally formed. As of 2017, it would make it over 110 years old.

The landmark of the park is the "Cross from the Mali Pijac". It was erected in 1862 by the merchant Ćira Hristić and placed at the Mali Pijac section of Savamala (Little Marketplace). Situated in front of the former hotel "Bosna", it was dedicated to the Karađorđe's rebels, who liberated Belgrade from the Turks in 1806, but conceptually it was a symbol of Christian victory over the Turks in general. Since the hotel was close to it, when Ćelović built the building of the Belgrade Cooperative from 1905 to 1907, he moved the cross to the Bristol Park. The cross is made of the reddish stone, rosso ammonitico, imported from Hungary. Together with the Vozarev Cross, it is one of the oldest monuments in Belgrade. In 1987 it was declared a cultural monument.

Since 2015 and the European migrant crisis, being close to the both main traffic stations, the Bristol Park is periodically occupied by the migrants, who sleep there in tents or in the open, then the government resettles them to the shelters but the new migrants keep occupying the park again.

References 

Parks in Belgrade
Savski Venac